Journal of Dermatological Science is a medical journal that covers the entire scope of dermatology, from molecular studies to clinical investigations. The journal is published by Elsevier.

Abstracting and indexing 
The journal is abstracted and indexed in:

 Science Citation Index
 Web of Science
 Embase
 BIOSIS Citation Index
 PubMed/Medline
 Abstracts on Hygiene and Communicable Diseases
 Elsevier BIOBASE

According to the Journal Citation Reports, the journal has a 2021 impact factor of 5.408.

References

External links 

 

Elsevier academic journals
English-language journals
Publications with year of establishment missing

Dermatology journals